Alice Rasmussen (born Alice Fallai 3 November 1926) is an Italian-Swedish art historian, and author, specialised in art history, botany, and August Strindberg (1849–1912).

Alice Rasmussen was born 1926 to Luigi Fallai, and Alice Carlsson. She is great-granddaughter of Friedrichs Lachs, and grand-nephew to Charles Lachs, whose artistry she covered in Södermalm med omnejd i bilder av Charles Lachs (Stockholmia förlag, 2009). She grew up in Rome, Italy, and in Stockholm, Sweden, and studied the humanities, as well as history of religion at Stockholm University.

Bibliography 
 Några synpunkter på Kristusikonografins utveckling fram till och med den ottonska konsten (1975)
 Flora och fauna i Strindbergs skärgårdsskildring under 1870– och 1880-talen (1977)
 Några exempel på ikonografiska parallellföreteelser i samtida religioner vid tiden för kristendomens genombrott (1978)
 Stilar i konsten – Rokoko av Flavio Conti (translation by Alice Rasmussen, Wahlström & Widstrand, 1979)
 Strindbergsporträtt. Ett bidrag till Strindbergs ikonografi (Tryckgruppen AB, 1986, 145 p.)
 Strindbergs porträtt (Bokförlaget Fingraf, 1991, 478 p.)
 Vår skärgårds flora (1992)
 Det går en oro genom själen. Strindbergs hem och vistelseorter i Norden (1997)
 Södermalm med omnejd i bilder av Charles Lachs (Stockholmia förlag, 2009)
 Strindbergs flora (CKM Förlag, 2009, 563 p.)
 Strindbergs flora (CKM Förlag, 2012, 662 p.)

External links
Alice Rasmussen at LIBRIS, National Library of Sweden

References

1926 births
Living people
20th-century Swedish women writers
20th-century Italian women writers
Swedish women academics
Italian art historians
Swedish art historians
Women art historians
Architecture academics
Swedish women botanists
21st-century Swedish botanists
20th-century Swedish botanists
Swedish translators
20th-century translators
Translators to Swedish
Translators from Italian